Ruposovo is a rural locality (a village) in Nizhneyerogodskoye Rural Settlement, Velikoustyugsky District, Vologda Oblast, Russia. The population was 3 as of 2002.

Geography 
Ruposovo is located 41 km southwest of Veliky Ustyug (the district's administrative centre) by road. Solovyevo is the nearest rural locality.

References 

Rural localities in Velikoustyugsky District